Chanelle Scheepers (born 13 March 1984) is a retired South African tennis player.

She won one singles and one doubles title on the WTA Tour, as well as 12 singles and 20 doubles titles on the ITF Women's Circuit in her career. On 10 October 2011, she reached her best singles ranking of world No. 37. On 10 April 2014, she peaked at No. 42 in the doubles rankings.

Career
Scheepers turned pro in 2000 and played two ITF events.

In 2001, she reached four finals on ITF level and won all, with three of them coming from Durban, South Africa a local tournament, and one in the United States.

In 2002, she reached three ITF finals winning one in Mackay, Australia and losing in the other two in Liechtenstein and Switzerland.

In 2003, she played her first tour-level event in the Mondial Australian Women's Hardcourts and won her first main-draw tour-level match after getting through the qualifying draw over Samantha Stosur but lost to Tathiana Garbin in the next round. She then had a 19 match losing streak in the qualifying draws of tour-level and ITF events and main draw of ITF events.

2004 was a better year for Scheepers, she returned playing in ITF events where she won four titles; two in Benin City, Nigeria and two in Pretoria, South Africa. She also reached four other finals in Torre del Greco and Taranto both in Italy, in Pétange, Luxembourg and Lagos, Nigeria.

In 2005, Scheepers once again started playing in the qualifying draw of tour-level events but she didn't produce results as she only reached one semifinals and one quarterfinals in ITF events.

2006 was not a better year for Scheepers despite returning to the ITF circuit as she only reached two semifinals and one quarterfinal.

In 2007, Scheepers won her first ITF titles in three years as she won two titles in Lagos, Nigeria and Allentown, Pennsylvania, United States.

In 2008, her form went down as she only reached one semifinal and two quarterfinals.

2009 was a breakthrough year for the South African player as she made her Grand Slam main-draw debut getting through the qualifying draw in the Australian Open and French Open. She also made four main-draw wins and won a title in Irapuato, Mexico.

In 2010, Scheepers continued to play in the tour-level events and her persistence paid off as she reached her first main-draw quarterfinals in the Malaysian Open losing to Japanese Ayumi Morita. She then won in the ITF event of Fort Walton Beach, United States. In the French Open, after coming through the qualifying draw, she won her first Grand Slam main-draw match over Frenchwoman Mathilde Johansson in straight sets. She then continued her form by upsetting both, Gisela Dulko and Akgul Amanmuradova. She lost to world No. 5, Elena Dementieva in the fourth round in two sets. As a result of this performance, she was awarded a wildcard into the main draw of Wimbledon, where she lost in the first round to ninth seed and eventual quarter-finalist Li Na.

In 2011, she made the third round of the Australian Open. Following modest results for much of the rest of the year, Scheepers reached the third round of the US Open, where she even held match points against Francesca Schiavone before losing the match in three sets. Following that, she won her first WTA single titles at Guangzhou, China as the seventh seed defeating the eighth seed Magdaléna Rybáriková in the final. Scheepers achieved her career-high singles rank of world No. 37 following the tournament.
On 13 July 2012, she lost to Serena Williams in the Stanford Classic.

In July 2012, she reached the second round of Mercury Insurance Open, Carlsbad losing to Varvara Lepchenko.

At the 2013 Wimbledon Championships, she teamed with Shuko Aoyama to advance to the semifinals in women's doubles.

In 2015, after the Family Cup in Charleston, she retired from the WTA Tour and later started coaching American tennis player Alison Riske.

Personal life
Scheepers married Roger Anderson, her former coach, on 10 November 2012, in the KwaZulu-Natal Midlands.

Performance timelines 
Only main-draw results in WTA Tour, Grand Slam tournaments, Fed Cup and Olympic Games are included in win–loss records.

Singles

Doubles

WTA career finals

Singles: 2 (1 title, 1 runner-up)

Doubles: 5 (1 title, 4 runner-ups)

ITF Circuit finals

Singles: 19 (12 titles, 7 runner-ups)

Doubles: 36 (20 titles, 16 runner-ups)

Notes

References

External links

 
 
 
 Official website

1984 births
South African expatriates in the United States
Afrikaner people
South African people of Dutch descent
Living people
South African female tennis players
Sportspeople from Pretoria
People from Harrismith